The 2018 European Table Tennis Championships were held in Alicante, Spain from 18 to 23 September 2018. The competition was held at Centro de Tecnificacion Deportiva.

Medal summary

Medal table

References

2018
European Championships
International sports competitions hosted by Spain
Table Tennis European Championships
Sport in Alicante
European Table Tennis Championships